In oral traditions associated with the early history of the Tagalog people, Empress Sasaban or Dayang Sasaban (Baybayin: ᜐᜐᜊᜈ᜔  , Javanese: ꦱꦼꦒꦮꦺꦴꦤ꧀) is said to have been a 14th Century noblewoman (Dayang) of the Tagalog polity of Namayan, on the shores of the Pasig River in Luzon.

In the legends, she leaves Namayan to marry to an "Emperor Soledan" (also identified as "Anka Widyaya") of the  Majapahit. At the Majapahit court, she gives birth to a son named Balagtas, who eventually returns to Luzon to rule over Balayan and Taal, and marry Princess Panginoan of Pasig.

However, there is no mention of her in the Negara Kertagama, thus her existence is unsure.

References

Empresses
Indonesian royalty
Year of birth missing
Year of death missing
History of Java